Billy Pilgrim (often stylized billy pilgrim) is an American folk rock duo based in Atlanta, Georgia, comprising Andrew Hyra and Kristian Bush. The band's name was taken from the time-traveling anti-hero of Kurt Vonnegut's novel Slaughterhouse-Five. The name was adopted in 1994; prior to that the duo simply billed itself as Andrew Hyra and Kristian Bush. The band has released two albums on a major record label (Billy Pilgrim, Bloom) and several independently. The songs "Get Me Out Of Here" and "Sweet Louisiana Sound" were released as singles.

History
Kristian Bush and Andrew Hyra (a brother of actress Meg Ryan) first began performing together in 1990. After about a year, they started recording their songs to tape. The self-release St. Christopher's Crossing was recorded in two days in a studio in Knoxville, Tennessee and appeared in 1991 (credited to "Andrew Hyra & Kristian Bush") on cassette. The album was released on CD in 1992 when Amy Ray of Indigo Girls helped them with the release costs. Playing hundreds of shows in the Southeast, their effort was noticed and they proceeded to record their second album Words Like Numbers under the indie label Sister Ruby. After this they signed to Atlantic Records, naming the group Billy Pilgrim.

In 1993 Billy Pilgrim recorded their debut album Billy Pilgrim at Nickel and Dime Studios, with Don McCollister producing and Hugh Padgham mixing the record. The eponymous album was a moderate success when released in 1994. With the next album, Bloom, the band launched a fall tour, headlining larger venues than they had in the past. Yet in early 1996, the band was dropped by Atlantic. After releasing several albums through Internet only, the album In the Time Machine became their last effort to date, released on May 12, 2001. An update on the band's website indicates that Billy Pilgrim are not currently active, but no official disbanding has been announced.

In 2016 Billy Pilgrim reunited during the annual Thanksgiving shows Kristian Bush gave in Decatur, Georgia. It was the first time in 15 years they shared the stage.

Their single "Insomniac" (written by Bush) has been a favorite of numerous a cappella groups.

Other projects
Both Hyra and Bush have released solo albums and worked with other musicians. Bush formed the country music group Sugarland in 2002 with Jennifer Nettles and Kristen Hall (who left in 2006, reducing Sugarland to a duo). Hyra released a solo album, Lost Songs, in 2006 and another,  Curios, in 2011. Hyra is now in a band with Brian Bristow called the Smokin' Novas.

Discography
Billy Pilgrim have released albums from 1991 - 2001.

Official albums
 Billy Pilgrim (January 1994)
 Bloom (May 1995) - Billboard Heatseekers #37

Independent releases
 St. Christopher's Crossing as Kristian Bush & Andrew Hyra (1991, cassette; 1992 CD)
 Words Like Numbers as Andrew Hyra & Kristian Bush (1993, 1994 re-issue)
 Live From Wildhack, MT (September 1999)
recorded live at Eddie's Attic in Decatur, Georgia in December 1998
 beSides (May 2000)
 Nine Twenty Three (09.23.00)  (November 2000)
recorded live at Eddie's Attic in Decatur, Georgia on 23 September 2000
 In The Time Machine (June 2001; re-released September 2020)

Singles
"Hurricane Season" (1994 USA)
"Insomniac"  (1994 USA)
"Get Me Out Of Here" (1994, Germany)
"Try" (1994 USA Promo only)
"Sweet Louisiana Sound" (1995)

References

External links
Kristian Bush homepage
Andrew Hyra homepage
Andrew Hyra at MySpace

American folk musical groups
Musical groups from Georgia (U.S. state)
American musical duos
Atlantic Records artists